Andrew Douglas-Home  (born 14 May 1950) is a Scottish former first-class cricketer.

The son of Edward Charles Douglas-Home and Nancy Rose Straker-Smith, he was born at Galashiels in May 1950. He was educated at Eton College, before going up to Christ Church, Oxford. While studying at Oxford, he made played first-class cricket for Oxford University in 1970, making four appearances against Hampshire, Warwickshire, Lancashire and Nottinghamshire. Playing as a right-arm fast-medium bowler, he took 9 wickets at an average of 30.33 and with best figures of 3 for 71. With the bat, he scored 33 runs with a high score of 23.

After graduating from Oxford, he became an accountant. He was made an OBE in the 2013 New Year Honours for his three decades’ service with the River Tweed Commissioners and for his role with the Abbotsford Trust, which is responsible for conserving Abbotsford House, the home of Walter Scott. His uncle, Lord Dunglass, also played first-class cricket and was Prime Minister of the United Kingdom from October 1963 to October 1964.

References

External links

1950 births
Living people
People from Galashiels
People educated at Eton College
Alumni of Christ Church, Oxford
Scottish cricketers
Oxford University cricketers
Scottish accountants
Members of the Order of the British Empire